Mecranium is a plant genus in the family Melastomataceae.

Species
The Plant List and Tropicos recognise 23 accepted species:
 Mecranium acuminatum  
 Mecranium alpestre  
 Mecranium amygdalinum  
 Mecranium axillare  
 Mecranium birimosum  
 Mecranium crassinerve  
 Mecranium haemanthum  
 Mecranium haitiense  
 Mecranium integrifolium  
 Mecranium latifolium  
 Mecranium microdictyum  
 Mecranium multiflorum  
 Mecranium obtusifolium  
 Mecranium ovatum  
 Mecranium plicatum  
 Mecranium puberulum  
 Mecranium purpurascens  
 Mecranium racemosum  
 Mecranium revolutum  
 Mecranium septentrionale  
 Mecranium tricostatum  
 Mecranium tuberculatum  
 Mecranium virgatum

References

Melastomataceae genera
Melastomataceae